Highway 241 (AR 241, Ark. 241, and Hwy. 241) is a north–south state highway in Monroe County. The route of  begins at US Highway 49 (US 49) and Highway 39 and runs west and north to Highway 302. The route is maintained by the Arkansas State Highway and Transportation Department (AHTD).

Route description
The route begins at US 49 and Highway 39 in eastern Monroe County in an aquaculture/agricultural area within the Arkansas Grand Prairie. Highway 241 runs due west as a section line road to an intersection with Highway 17 toward Keevil and Brinkley.

History
The route was extended east to Highway 17 at Keevil on July 2, 1960, and to US 49 and Highway 39 on June 23, 1965. On January 26, 1977, the north-south portion of the highway to Clarendon was redesignated as Highway 302 to improve route designation continuity, leaving the remaining segments of east–west section line road with an odd-numbered designation normally indicative of north–south routes.

Major intersections
Mile markers reset at concurrencies.

See also

References

External links

241
Transportation in Monroe County, Arkansas